Gustafva "Stafva" Carolina Lindskog (1794-1851), was a Swedish athlete. She was a pioneer within the field of physical education of females in Sweden, and likely the first female teacher in physical education of her country.

Lindskog was the great granddaughter of the merchant Gustaf Lindskog in Stockholm. In 1818, she was appointed instructor in the first class of physical education for females, as the head of the gymnastic for women at the Royal Central Gymnastics Institute. Formally, she was not referred to as an instructor and teacher but merely as replacement for the male teacher P H Ling and called "Movement Giver". It was in fact not until 1849 that she was formally given the title of ordinary teacher at the institute. This was one year after the first female, Greta Stina Bohm, had become a master of swimming, followed by the pioneer Nancy Edberg. Lindskog was the first female to be employed by the state as a teacher and instructor in Physical therapy. She was succeeded in her position by her pupil Hildur Ling in 1851.

References 

 Lindskog, släkt, urn:sbl:10658, Svenskt biografiskt lexikon (art av CHC), hämtad 2014-08-16.

1794 births
1851 deaths
19th-century Swedish people
Swedish educators
19th-century sportswomen